Hama uprising may refer to:

 1925 Hama uprising, part of the Great Syrian Revolt
 1964 Hama riot (1964 Hama uprising)
 April 1981 Hama massacre during the Islamic uprising in Syria
 Hama massacre 1982 during the Islamic uprising in Syria
 Siege of Hama (2011) during the 2011 Syrian uprising